Frieda Zamba is a four-time world surfing champion from the United States. She won three titles in a row from 1984 to 1986, then won again in 1988.  She lives in Costa Rica.
 
Frieda Zamba was the youngest female to win a pro tour contest and the youngest surfing world champion ever. She went on to win three titles in a row and then fought back to win a fourth. Outright dangerous in small to mid-size surf, Zamba crossed the performance chasm that separated male and female surfers in the 80's and, based solely on performance, is regarded by many as the greatest female
surfer ever.

Besides being a talented and tactical competitor Zamba was incredibly popular during her reign. She won 5 straight Surfer Poll awards from 1985 to 1989 and was profiled in a 1987 piece in Sports Illustrated titled "Queen of the Surf." In 1998 she was inducted into the Surfing Walk of Fame as that year's Woman of the Year; the Walk is in Huntington Beach, California. She is still hailed as a bona fide hero in her home town, being the obvious namesake for the Frieda Zamba Swimming Pool at the Palm Coast Aquatics Center in Palm Coast, Florida.

Frieda Zamba's surfing blurred the edges between male and female wave riders, and while that may be a cliché used when describing great women surfers, she proved it by regularly out-surfing male competitors. At a time when surfing finally demanded a global audience, Frieda Zamba was the undisputed queen of professional surfing.

References

Jetty Girl interview
Surfline biography 
Cool chicks from history 
Surfing Walk of Fame 
World Champions of Surfing biography
East Coast Wahines 
Sports Illustrated profile

External links
Surf video of Frieda by Greg Meischeid
Soul Surfer trailer
Sports Illustrated profile
Treko profile

American surfers
World Surf League surfers
American female surfers
1965 births
Living people
21st-century American women